Axel Fredrik Bjurström, born 6 January 1846 in Malmö, died 21 January 1890 in Ystad, was a Swedish newspaper publisher and businessman. He is most famous for founding the paper Ystads Allehanda in 1873.

References 

1846 births
1890 deaths
People from Malmö
Swedish newspaper publishers (people)
19th-century Swedish businesspeople
19th-century Swedish journalists
19th-century male writers
Male journalists